Huntoon Lake is a 42.5-acre private, all-sports lake in Waterford Township in Oakland County, Michigan.

The 15-ft deep lake is spring fed and is entirely residential. It is located along Airport Rd. north of Hatchery Rd. and south of Williams Lake Rd.

Namesake

Huntoon Lake named for Daniel Huntoon (d.1851), who first settled on 165 acres in sections 8 and 9 of Waterford Township on the south shore of lake that later would bear his family name. Huntoon and his sons Philetus (1824-1869), Phineas (1827-1903) and Horace (1831-1897) came to Waterford in 1832 from New Hampshire.

After the death of their father, Philetus ran the family farm in Waterford. In 1860, Phineas became the proprietor of the Waterford General Store, which was built in 1857 by the previous proprietor, his brother Horace.

Fish
Fish in Scott Lake include sunfish, bluegill, largemouth bass, perch, northern pike, crappie and bullhead.

References

Lakes of Oakland County, Michigan
Lakes of Michigan
Lakes of Waterford Township, Michigan